New Maysville is an unincorporated community in Jackson Township, Putnam County, in the U.S. state of Indiana.

History
New Maysville was laid out in 1832, and named after Maysville, Kentucky. A post office was established at New Maysville in 1834, and remained in operation until it was discontinued in 1919.

Geography

References

Unincorporated communities in Putnam County, Indiana
Unincorporated communities in Indiana